List of ambassadors and permanent representatives to the North Atlantic Treaty Organization (North Atlantic Council)

References

NATO
 
Canada Permanent Representatives
Canada